El Potrero may refer to:
 El Potrero, Catamarca, a village and rural municipality in Catamarca Province, Argentina
 El Potrero, Salta, a village and rural municipality in Salta Province, Argentina
 El Potrero River, El Salvador
 El Potrero Chico, a rock climbing area in Nuevo León, Mexico
 El Potrero de la Punta del Tiburon, now Belvedere Island, California, United States
 El Potrero, Coclé, Panama
 El Potrero, Veraguas, Panama

See also 
 Potrero (disambiguation)